Elin Gunhild "Gullan" Bornemark, born Bohlin 28 November 1927 in Härnösand, Sweden, is a Swedish musician, lyricist, composer and, between 1951 and 2007, music teacher.

She wrote song lyrics, usually using already famous tunes, for Anita och Televinken with the ambition of teaching children how to behave in traffic.

Famous songs

"Lillebror" (1964)

 (also known as )

References 

1927 births
Living people
Swedish composers
Swedish male composers
Swedish songwriters
People from Härnösand
Children's songwriters